Bourletiella is a genus of springtails of the family Bourletiellidae of the suborder Symphypleona.

Species
 Bourletiella aquatica Maynard, 1951
 Bourletiella arvalis (Fitch, 1863)
 Bourletiella christianseni Snider, 1978
 Bourletiella coalingaensis Snider, 1978
 Bourletiella dreisbachi (Snider, 1969)
 Bourletiella hortensis (Fitch, 1863) – Garden springtail
 Bourletiella ihu Christiansen & Bellinger, 1992
 Bourletiella insula Folsom, 1932
 Bourletiella juanitae Maynard, 1951
 Bourletiella lippsoni Snider, 1978
 Bourletiella lurida Snider, 1978
 Bourletiella millsi Pedigo, 1968
 Bourletiella nonfasciata Snider, 1978
 Bourletiella polena Christiansen and Bellinger, 1992
 Bourletiella repanda Agren, 1903
 Bourletiella russata Maynard, 1951
 Bourletiella rustica Maynard, 1951
 Bourletiella savona Maynard, 1951
 Bourletiella spinata (Macgillivray, 1893)
 Bourletiella validentata Snider, 1978
 Bourletiella viridescens Stach, 1920
 Bourletiella wexfordensis (Snider, 1969)
 Bourletiella xeromorpha Snider, 1978

References 

Springtail genera